This is a list of the number-one albums of 2013 in Poland, per the OLiS chart.

Chart history

References

Number-one albums
Poland
2013